Tuoba Jiefen was the 14th ancestor of the imperial clan of the Northern Wei dynasty of China. He was the chieftain of the Suotou (索頭) tribe of the Xianbei, son of the ruler Tuoba Lin. He probably ruled circa 190-195 CE. When Tuoba Gui (Emperor Daowu) founded the Northern Wei, Tuoba Jiefen was posthumously named  Emperor Shengwu (聖武皇帝).

According to the Book of Wei, Tuoba Jiefen led the second southward migration of the Tuoba clan. A description of the event also appears in the "Treatise on Auspicious and Inauspicious Influences" (Lingzheng Zhi) in the Book of Wei:

Tuoba Jiefen is probably the ancestral leader mentioned by the 6th century Northern Zhou general Li Xian in his epitaph, as "Emperor Sheng of Wei" (魏聖帝).

See also 
 History of the Northern Dynasties

References

People of the Three Kingdoms
Southern Liang (Sixteen Kingdoms)
Chieftains of the Tuoba clan